The Kuppe is a mountain in the Harz that lies north of Sankt Andreasberg in the district of Goslar in the German state of Lower Saxony. It is 729.1 metres high and is connected to the Jordanshöhe in the west.

References 

Mountains of the Harz
Mountains under 1000 metres
Mountains of Lower Saxony